Gleditsch is a surname. Notable people with the surname include:

Bjørn Ole Gleditsch (born 1963), Norwegian businessperson and politician for the Conservative Party
Ellen Gleditsch (1879–1968), Norwegian radiochemist and Norway's second female professor
Henry Gleditsch (1902–1942), Norwegian actor and theatre director
Jens Gran Gleditsch (1860–1931), Norwegian bishop and theologian
Johann Friedrich Gleditsch (1653–1716), German book publisher
Johann Gottlieb Gleditsch (1714–1786), German physician and botanist who investigated plant sexuality and reproduction
Kristen Gran Gleditsch (1867–1946), Norwegian military officer and topographer
Kristian Gleditsch, MBE (1901–1973), Norwegian civil engineer and geodesist
Kristian Skrede Gleditsch (born 1971), Norwegian political scientist and Regius Professor at the University of Essex
Nils Petter Gleditsch (born 1942), Norwegian sociologist and political scientist
Nini Haslund Gleditsch (1908–1996), Norwegian political activist and advocate for peace
Rolf Juell Gleditsch (1892–1984), Norwegian painter

Middle name:
Eline Gleditsch Brustad (born 1994), Norwegian racing cyclist
Jorunn Gleditsch Lossius (born 1980), Norwegian politician for the Christian Democratic Party

See also
Gletsch
Glitch